The 2021 Michigan Wolverines football team represented the University of Michigan a member of the East Division of the Big Ten Conference during the 2021 NCAA Division I FBS football season. In their seventh year under head coach Jim Harbaugh, the team compiled an overall record of 12–2 record with a mark of 8–1 against conference opponents, won the Big Ten championship, outscored opponents by a total of 501 to 243, and was ranked No. 3 in the final AP and Coaches Polls. The Wolverines advanced to the College Football Playoff for the first time in program history, losing to eventual national champion Georgia in the Orange Bowl.

After starting the season unranked, Michigan won its first seven games, including victories on the road against Wisconsin and Nebraska. On October 30, Michigan (ranked No. 6) lost to Michigan State (ranked No. 8). The Wolverines rebounded with five consecutive wins, including a 42–27 victory over No. 2 Ohio State – Michigan's first victory over its rival since 2011. The Wolverines advanced to the Big Ten Football Championship Game, defeating Iowa, 42–3. It was Michigan's first conference championship since 2004 and its first outright title since 2003. 

The team's statistical leaders included Cade McNamara with 2,576 passing yards, Hassan Haskins with 1,327 rushing yards, Cornelius Johnson with 627 receiving yards, Jake Moody with 125 points scored, Josh Ross with 106 total tackles, and Aidan Hutchinson with 14 quarterback sacks.

Aidan Hutchinson won the Big Ten Defensive Player of the Year award, was a unanimous first-team All-American, and finished second in the voting for the Heisman Trophy. Jake Moody was also a consensus first-team All-American and the recipient of the Lou Groza Award as the nation's top kicker. Harbaugh won the Associated Press College Football Coach of the Year Award, and offensive coordinator Josh Gattis won the Broyles Award as the nation's top assistant coach. The Wolverines' offensive line won the Joe Moore Award. Six Michigan players received first-team honors on the All-Big Ten football team: Hutchinson, Moody, Haskins, David Ojabo, Daxton Hill, and Andrew Stueber.

Preseason

2020 season
The 2020 Michigan Wolverines football team compiled a 2–4 record in the COVID-19-shortened season. It was the program's worst record since 2008. The defense gave up an average of 34.5 points per game, ranking 95th among the nation's 128 major college football programs.

Firing of Don Brown
On December 22, 2020, Michigan fired defensive coordinator Don Brown. Brown had taken over as defensive coordinator in 2016 and led the 2016 squad to a No. 1 national ranking.

Harbaugh's extension
On January 8, 2021, head coach Jim Harbaugh signed a four-year contract extension with Michigan, continuing through the 2025 season. The extension reduced Harbaugh's $8-million base salary to $4 million for the 2021 season but added incentive bonuses of $500,000 for winning the Big Ten East, $1 million for winning the Big Ten championship, $500,000 for reaching the College Football Playoff semifinal, $1 million for winning the College Football Playoff, $75,000 for winning National Coach of the Year honors, and $50,000 for winning Big Ten Coach of the Year honors. The new agreement also lowered the buyout that the university would be required to pay if it fired him before the end of the contract.

Coaching changes
Following his four-year extension, Harbaugh led a major overhaul of the Michigan coaching staff. The overhaul shifted away from older coaches (Don Brown was 65, Ed Warinner was 59) to younger with 10 assistants under age 40. The moves included the following:

 On January 13, Michigan hired 34-year-old Mike Hart as running backs coach. Hart played for Michigan from 2004 to 2007 and set Michigan's career record with 5,040 rushing yards. He had been the running backs coach at Indiana since 2017 and associate head coach in 2020.

 On January 17, Michigan hired 33-year-old Mike Macdonald as defensive coordinator. Macdonald was hired based on the recommendation of coach Harbaugh's brother, John Harbaugh. Macdonald spent the previous seven seasons as an assistant coach on John Harbaugh's staff with the Baltimore Ravens.

 On January 19, Michigan hired 34-year-old George Helow, who had been Maryland's special teams coordinator and inside linebackers coach. Helow was initially assigned to coach safeties but was reassigned to linebackers.

 On January 20, Michigan hired 36-year-old Maurice Linguist as defensive backs coach and co-defensive coordinator, but he left three months later to become head coach at Buffalo.

 On January 25, Michigan hired 39-year-old Ronald Bellamy as the wide receivers coach (later switched to safeties). Bellamy was a wide receiver at Michigan from 1999 to 2002 and, prior to the hiring, was the head football coach at West Bloomfield High School. 

 Also on January 25, Michigan announced several other moves. Sherrone Moore (age 34) moved from tight ends coach to offensive line coach and co-offensive coordinator. Jay Harbaugh (age 31) moved from running backs to tight ends and special teams.

 In February, offensive line coach Ed Warinner (age 59) left Michigan for Florida Atlantic.

 Also in February, Brian Jean-Mary left Michigan to become the linebackers coach at Tennessee. 

 On February 22, Michigan hired Baltimore Ravens running backs coach Matt Weiss (age 37) as the new quarterbacks coach.

 In May 2021, Michigan hired Kentucky assistant coach Steve Clinkscale (age 42) to become the defensive backs coach and defensive passing game coordinator.

Offensive coordinator Josh Gattis (age 38) and defensive line coach Shaun Nua (age 40) were the only two assistants who remained in their prior positions.

Recruiting

2021 recruiting class

Incoming transfers

Schedule

Rankings

Game summaries

Western Michigan

Sources:

    
    
    
    
    
    
    
    
    

On September 4, Michigan opened their season with a 47–14 victory over Western Michigan. The game was played at Michigan Stadium before a crowd of 109,925. 

On the game's opening drive, Michigan drove 75 yards, capped by a 14-yard touchdown pass from Cade McNamara to Blake Corum. Western Michigan responded with their own 75-yard drive, led by Kaleb Eleby's passing and ending with a two-yard touchdown run by La'Darius Jefferson. After the Broncos' touchdown, Blake Corum returned the kickoff 79 yards to the Western Michigan 21-yard line. The drive stalled at the 18-yard line, and Jake Moody kicked a 37-yard field goal to give Michigan a 10–7 lead at the end of the first quarter.

After giving up a touchdown on the Broncos' opening drive, Michigan's defense held Western Michigan to 18 yards in the remaining four drives of the first half. Michigan's offense also gained momentum with 17 points in the second quarter. Cade McNamara connected with Ronnie Bell for a 76-yard touchdown strike. Michigan's next possession started with a 36-yard punt return by Ronnie Bell, but Bell sustained a season-ending injury on the play. Hassan Haskins ran 22 yards for his first touchdown of the season with 6:18 remaining in the second quarter. At the end of the half, Michigan drove to the Broncos' one-yard line but settled for a 20-yard field goal by Moody, which made the score 27–7 in favor of Michigan at half-time.

On Michigan's first drive of the second half, A. J. Henning ran 74 yards for a touchdown, and Michigan's attempt at a two-point conversion failed. Early in the fourth quarter, Michigan sustained an 87-yard drive, culminating with a 30-yard touchdown run by Corum.  True freshman quarterback J. J. McCarthy saw his first action in the fourth quarter. On third-and-25 from Michigan's 31-yard line, McCarthy scrambled and threw across the field to Daylen Baldwin for a 69-yard touchdown pass. Late in the fourth quarter, Kaleb Eleby led the Broncos on a 64-yard touchdown drive ending with a 27-yard pass to Corey Crooms.

Corum rushed for 111 yards and two touchdowns and became the first Michigan player to score a rushing and receiving touchdown in the same game since Khalid Hill in 2016. McNamara completed nine of 11 passes for 136 yards and two touchdowns. Aidan Hutchinson had a sack and blocked a field goal. Michigan's 550 yards of total offense were their most since tallying 660 yards against Maryland in 2016.

Washington

Sources:

    
    
    
    
    
    

On September 11, Michigan defeated Washington, 31–10, in the tenth ever night game at Michigan Stadium. It was the first meeting between the teams since 2002. The teams had been scheduled to meet in 2020 in Seattle, but that game was postponed due to the COVID-19 pandemic.

Michigan's defense held Washington scoreless in the first half. Michigan began their second possession near midfield after Caden Kolesar returned a punt for 20 yards. Hassan Haskins carried twice to advance the ball to Washington's 34-yard line, and Jake Moody kicked a 52-yard field goal. With 9:47 remaining in the second quarter, Blake Corum ran 67 yards for a touchdown, which made the score 10–0 in favor of Michigan at halftime.

On the opening drive of the second half, Michigan ran the ball eight times (four by Haskins, four by Corum) for 73 yards with Corum scoring on a seven-yard run. Washington responded with a ten-minute, 72-yard drive, ending with a 28-yard field goal by Peyton Henry. Michigan then responded with another long drive, taking the ball 75 yards in seven minutes, Haskins scoring on a six-yard run with 13:56 remaining. Washington responded with another long drive, marching 75 yards and ending with a 22-yard touchdown pass from Dylan Morris to Terrell Bynum. With 1:48 remaining, Michigan added a final touchdown on a four-yard run by Corum.

Michigan had 343 rushing yards in the game (Corum 171 yards, three touchdowns; Haskins 155 yards, one touchdown). Cade McNamara completed seven of 15 passes for 44 yards. The defense gave up 293 passing yards by Dylan Morris but held Washington to 50 rushing yards on 32 carries. Aidan Hutchinson had 2.5 sacks, and David Ojabo had a sack and a fumble recovery.

Northern Illinois

Sources:

    
    
    
    
    
    
    
    
    
    

On September 18, Michigan defeated Northern Illinois (NIU), 63–10, before a crowd of 106,263 at Michigan Stadium. The game drew attention as NIU quarterback Rocky Lombardi had played for Michigan State in 2020, leading the Spartans to a 27–24 victory over the Wolverines.

On their opening possession, Michigan took over in NIU territory after A. J. Henning returned a punt 25 yards. Cade McNamara scored on a one-yard run. NIU responded with a 72-yard drive ending with a 21-yard field goal by John Richardson. The Wolverines held NIU scoreless for the rest of the first half, while the Wolverines scored four touchdowns on one-yard runs by Blake Corum and Hassan Haskins, a five-yard run by Haskins, and an 87-yard touchdown pass from McNamara to Cornelius Johnson, which made the score 35–3 in favor of Michigan at half-time.

Michigan broke the game open with 28 points in the third quarter. On the opening drive of the second half, Corum ran 51 yards for a touchdown. After holding NIU to a three-and-out, A. J. Henning returned a punt 32 yards to the NIU 48-yard line. Michigan scored again on a one-yard run by Corum. On the next NIU possession, Gemon Green intercepted a Rocky Lombardi pass and returned it 27 yards to the NIU three-yard line. Donovan Edwards scored on a four-yard run. The defense forced another three-and-out, and Donovan Edwards scored on a 58-yard touchdown run. Michigan led, 63–3, with 4:13 remaining in the third quarter. Michigan emptied their bench and did not score in the fourth quarter. NIU scored the only points of the fourth quarter on a nine-yard pass from Lombardi to Cole Tucker.

Michigan tallied 373 rushing yards in the game, led by Corum with 125 yards and three touchdowns on 13 carries. It was Corum's third consecutive 100-yard rushing game, making him the first Michigan player to accomplish the feat since Denard Robinson in 2011. Cade McNamara completed eight of 11 passes for 191 yards. His 87-yard touchdown pass to Cornelius Johnson was the third longest in program history. The defense held NIU to 46 passing yards and 161 rushing yards. Aidan Hutchinson recorded one sack. A. J. Henning returned five punts for 70 yards.

Rutgers

Sources:

    
    
    
    
    
    

On September 25, Michigan defeated Rutgers, 20–13, before a homecoming crowd of 106,943 at Michigan Stadium. It was the seventh consecutive victory for Michigan over Rutgers. 

On the game's opening drive, Michigan sustained a 74-yard, seven-and-a half-minute drive, culminating with a one-yard touchdown run by Hassan Haskins. Rutgers responded with a 53-yard drive to the Michigan 22-yard line. Valentino Ambrosio kicked a 40-yard field goal.  Michigan then quickly drove 72 yards on a drive that featured passes of 24 yards to Erick All and 38 yards to Roman Wilson
. Haskins scored again on a three-yard run with 14:40 remaining in the second quarter. Jake Moody kicked two field goals, from 32 yards, and 20 yards, respectively, in the second quarter, which made the score 20–3 in favor of Michigan at half-time.

Michigan was held scoreless and limited to 47 yards of total offense in the second half. In the third quarter, Rutgers narrowed the lead to 20–10 with a 91-yard, five-and-a-half minute touchdown drive, capped by a 14-yard touchdown pass from Noah Vedral to Aaron Young. Late in the third quarter, Rutgers again drove deep into Michigan territory, and Ambrosio kicked a 25-yard field goal to bring Rutgers within seven points.  Rutgers' attempted comeback failed when Michigan forced Rutgers' first turnover of the season. With 1:37 remaining in the game, David Ojabo forced a fumble by Noah Vedral, and Junior Colson recovered the loose ball for Michigan.

Michigan was limited to 275 yards of total offense in the game. Cade McNamara completed nine of 16 passes for 163 yards, and Michigan's ground game was limited to 112 yards. Blake Corum rushed for 68 yards on 21 carries, and Hassan Haskins tallied 41 yards and two touchdowns on 12 carries. Rutgers tallied 352 yards of total offense, out-gaining the Wolverines by 77 yards. Aidan Hutchinson recorded a sack.

at Wisconsin

Sources:

    
    
    
    
    
    
    
    
    

On October 2, Michigan defeated Wisconsin, 38–17, before a crowd of 74,855 at Camp Randall Stadium in Madison, Wisconsin. Michigan had lost to Wisconsin by a 49–11 score in 2020 and had not won a game in Madison since 2001. It was also the first victory for Michigan as an underdog (after 12 defeats) under coach Harbaugh.

In their first two possessions, Michigan turned the ball over on downs and punted. On their third possession, A. J. Henning returned a punt 19 yards to Michigan's 41-yard line. From there, the Wolverines drove 59 yards and scored on 34-yard touchdown pass from Cade McNamara to Cornelius Johnson. At the end of the first quarter, Hunter Wohler fumbled a Brad Robbins punt, and Michigan recovered the ball at the Wisconsin five-yard line. Despite excellent field possession, the Wolverines were unable to punch the ball into the end zone and settled for a 26-yard Jake Moody field goal. Midway through the second quarter, Wisconsin drove 78 yards to the Michigan 16-yard line but had to settle for a 34-yard field goal by Collin Larsh. In the closing minutes of the half, Michigan drove to Wisconsin's 29-yard line, and Moody kicked a 47-yard field goal with 27 seconds remaining in the half. In the final 27 seconds of the half, Wisconsin drove 63 yards as Graham Mertz passed for 38 yards to Chimere Dike and for 18 yards to Dike for a touchdown, which made the score 13–10 in favor of Michigan at half-time.

On the opening drive of the second half, Michigan held Wisconsin to a three-and-out and knocked Mertz out of the game with a sack by Josh Ross and Daxton Hill. Michigan then drove 59 yards in a five-minute drive capped by a one-yard touchdown run by J. J. McCarthy. At the start of the fourth quarter, David Ojabo sacked Wisconsin's backup quarterback Chase Wolf and forced a fumble that was recovered by Christopher Hinton Jr. at the Badgers' 38-yard line. Moody kicked a 48-yard field goal. On the next play from scrimmage, Daxton Hill intercepted a Chase Wolf pass and Michigan took over at the Wisconsin 35-yard line. From there, Cade McNamara completed passes to Erick All for 19 yards and to Cornelius Jackson for 13 yards and a touchdown. The Wolverines added a two-point conversion on a pass from McNamara to Johnson. On Michigan's next possession, J. J. McCarthy threw a 56-yard touchdown pass to Daylen Baldwin with 5:07 remaining in the game. With 1:37 remaining in the game, Michigan's third-string quarterback Alan Bowman was intercepted, and Wisconsin took over at the Wolverines' 43-yard line. Chase Wolf threw a touchdown pass to Clay Cundiff with 0:32 remaining.

Michigan was limited to 112 rushing yards in the game. McNamara and McCarthy combined for 253 passing yards and three touchdowns. On defense, the Wolverines held the Badgers to 42 rushing yards and 167 passing yards. The defense also tallied a season-high six sacks, including two-and-a-half sacks for David Ojabo. During Wisconsin's Jump Around between the third and fourth quarters, Michigan players flooded onto the field, dancing and waving towels.

at Nebraska

Sources:

    
    
    
    
    
    
    
    
    
    

On October 9, Michigan defeated Nebraska, 32–29, before a crowd of 87,380 in Lincoln, Nebraska. The schools last faced each other in 2018, when Michigan won, 56–10. The victory was Michigan's first in three road games against Nebraska. 

After holding Michigan to a three-and-out on the opening drive, Nebraska drove 78 yards to the Michigan three-yard line, but Michigan stopped Adrian Martinez for a one-yard loss on fourth-and-goal. Neither team scored in the opening quarter.

In the second quarter, Michigan scored 13 points and again held Nebraska scoreless. On the opening drive of the quarter, Daxton Hill intercepted a Martinez pass at Nebraska's 35-yard line. Michigan then drove to the 17-yard line, and Jake Moody kicked a 35-yard field goal. On Michigan's next possession, the Wolverines drove 87 yards (including a 48-yard pass from Cade McNamara to Mike Sainristil) ending at the Nebraska one-yard line. Michigan then settled for another field goal.  Michigan got the ball back with 1:27 remaining in the half and drove 76 yards as McNamara completed five passes and Blake Corum ran 26 yards to the Nebraska 15-yard line. A pass interference penalty moved the ball to the three-yard line, and Hassan Haskins scored on a three-yard run with nine seconds left in the half, which made the score 13–0 in favor of Michigan at half-time.

Nebraska scored 22 points in the third quarter to take a 22–19 lead. On the opening drive of the second half, the Cornhuskers drove 79 yards and scored on a 46-yard touchdown pass from Martinez to Austin Allen. Later in the quarter, Michigan drove 91 yards on 10 plays, culminating in a three-yard touchdown run by Haskins. Michigan's attempt at a two-point conversion failed. Nebraska responded on their next possession with a 75-yard drive, ending with a 41-yard touchdown pass from Martinez to Rahmir Johnson. With 59 seconds remaining in the third quarter, Nebraska's Deontai Williams intercepted a Cade McNamara pass and returned it 20 yards to the Michigan 13-yard line. On the next play from scrimmage, Martinez threw a 13-yard touchdown pass to Levi Falck. Martinez then ran for a two-point conversion.

On the opening drive of the fourth quarter, Michigan drove 75 yards in 10 plays, ending with a 29-yard touchdown run by Blake Corum. Nebraska then responded with a 75-yard drive ending with a five-yard touchdown run by Martinez. Halfway through the fourth quarter, Michigan drove 69 yards to the Nebraska 13-yard line, and Jake Moody kicked a 31-yard field goal to tie the game with 3:00 minutes remaining.  On the following drive, Brad Hawkins forced a fumble by Martinez, with Hawkins recovering the ball and returning it 19 yards to the Nebraska 18-yard line. Moody kicked a game-winning, 39-yard field goal with 1:24 remaining in the game.

Michigan had 459 yards of total offense in the game. Cade McNamara completed 22 of 38 passes for 255 yards and one interception. Hassan Haskins rushed for 123 yards and two touchdowns, and Blake Corum added 89 yards and one touchdown.  Nebraska quarterback Adrian Martinez completed 18 of 28 passes for 291 yards, three touchdowns, and an interception. David Ojabo had one sack in the game.

Northwestern

Sources:

    
    
    
    
    
    

After a bye week, Michigan defeated Northwestern, 33–7, before a crowd of 109,449 at Michigan Stadium. For the first time, the teams played for the newly-created George Jewett Trophy, honoring the first black player on both teams. Michigan and Northwestern had not played since 2018.

The game began with five drives ending in punts and a scoreless first quarter. Late in the first and into the second quarter, Michigan drove 79 yards in 13 plays covering eight-and-a-half minutes. Blake Corum scored on a one-yard run. Michigan mounted another long drive (55 yards, eight-and-a-half minutes) ending with a 20-yard field goal by Jake Moody. Northwestern responded with a quick-strike, 75-yard touchdown run from Evan Hull. After Northwester's touchdown, Michigan drove 75 yards in the final two minutes of the half but Mike Sainristil fumbled at the two-yard line.

On the opening possession of the second half, Michigan drove 74 yards. Blake Corum accounted for 45 of the yards on four carries and scored on a five-yard run. Ryan Hilinski then led Northwestern on a 59-yard drive but Charlie Kuhbander missed a 39-yard field goal attempt. With six minutes remaining in the third quarter, Cornelius Johnson blocked a Northwestern punt, and Caden Kolesaar returned the ball nine yards to the Wildcats' 24-yard line. Michigan scored on a 13-yard touchdown run by Hassan Haskins. The Wolverines added a 44-yard Jake Moody field goal at the end of the third quarter to extend Michigan's lead to 27–7.

On the first play of the fourth quarter, DJ Turner intercepted a Hilinski pass, returning it 23 yards to the Northwestern 15-yard line. Haskins scored on a four-yard run, and Michigan's attempt for a two point conversion failed. Both teams traded fumbles, and Jake Moody missed a 47-yard field goal with 4:17 remaining.

Michigan rushed for 294 yards in the game, including 119 by Corum and 110 by Haskins. McNamara and McCarthy combined for 163 passing yards. On defense, the Wolverines held the Wildcats to 233 yards (133 passing, 100 rushing). Aidan Hutchinson and David Ojabo shared a sack.

at No. 8 Michigan State

Sources:

    
    
    
    
    
    
    
    
    
    
    

After hosting Northwestern, Michigan traveled to East Lansing to face their in-state rival, the Michigan State Spartans, in the battle for the Paul Bunyan Trophy. Last season, Michigan was upset by Michigan State 27–24.

Michigan lost to Michigan State 37–33. Michigan scored ten points in the first quarter via a 93-yard touchdown pass from Cade McNamara to Andrel Anthony and a 26-yard field goal by Jake Moody. Michigan State responded with 14 points in the second quarter via two touchdown runs from Kenneth Walker III from 27 yards, and eight yards, respectively. Michigan scored 13 points via a 17-yard touchdown pass from J. J. McCarthy to Andrel Anthony and two field goals by Moody from 38 yards, and 35 yards, respectively, which made the score 23–14 in favor of Michigan at half-time. The teams exchanged touchdowns in the third quarter, first a 19-yard touchdown pass from McNamara to Mike Sainristil for Michigan, then a one-yard touchdown run from Walker III and a two-point conversion pass from Payton Thorne to Tre Mosley for Michigan State. In the fourth quarter Michigan State scored via a 58-yard touchdown run from Walker III and a two-point conversion pass from Thorne to Jayden Reed to tie the game. Michigan responded with a 36-yard field goal by Moody to regain the lead. Michigan State responded with a 23-yard touchdown run from Walker III.

Andrel Anthony scored a 93-yard touchdown reception on his first career touch, this was the longest first-career reception for any player at Michigan. This was also the second-longest passing touchdown in program history.

Indiana

Sources:

    
    
    
    
    
    

On November 6, Michigan defeated Indiana, 29–7, before a crowd of 109,890 at Michigan Stadium.  Michigan lost to Indiana, 38–21, in 2020, but Indiana had not won at Michigan Stadium since 1967.

The first quarter was scoreless until the final play of the quarter when Jake Moody kicked a 34-yard field goal. Three plays later, David Ojabo sacked Donaven McCulley, causing McCulley to fumble. Christopher Hinton Jr. recovered the ball at the Indiana 24-yard line, and Hassan Haskins took a short pass for 20 yards to the four-yard line and, two plays later, ran two yards for a touchdown. Indiana responded with their only scoring drive of the game, as Donaven McCulley completed two passes to Peyton Hendershot and ran 24 yards to the Michigan two-yard line. Chris Childress carried it across to bring the Hoosiers within three points. On the next drive, Haskins broke away for his longest gain of the year, a 62-yard run down the left sideline to the Indiana 13-yard line. Two plays later, Cade McNamara threw a 12-yard touchdown pass to Luke Schoonmaker, which made the score 17–7 in favor of Michigan at half-time.

Michigan added the only points in the third quarter on two field goals by Moody, from 32 yards, and 34 yards, respectively. On Michigan's first play from scrimmage in the fourth quarter, McNamara passed for 50 yards to Cornelius Johnson at the Indiana 10-yard line. Two plays later, he threw an eight-yard touchdown pass to Schoonmaker. McNamara was sacked on attempt at a two-point conversion. Late in the fourth quarter, J. J. McCarthy threw his first interception of the year on a pass that tipped high into the air off the hands of Cornelius Johnson.

Michigan rushed for 188 yards, including 168 yards and a touchdown by Haskins. McNamara and J. J. McCarthy combined for 223 passing yards, two touchdowns, and one interception. The defense held Indiana to 195 yards of total offense (88 passing and 107 rushing). David Ojabo recorded a sack and his Big Ten-leading fourth forced fumble of the season.

at Penn State
 

Sources: 

    
    
    
    
    
    

On November 13, Michigan defeated Penn State, 21–17, at Beaver Stadium in State College, Pennsylvania. On the game's opening drive, the Nittany Lions drove 51 yards in 14 plays lasting over five minutes. The drive stalled at Michigan's 15-yard line, and Jordan Stout kicked a 42-yard field goal. After holding Michigan to a three-and-out, Penn State drove to the Michigan two-yard line, but Stout fumbled, and Daxton Hill recovered the ball. In the second quarter, Michigan drove 90 yards in 15 plays and over seven minutes, culminating with a 21-yard touchdown pass from Cade McNamara to Roman Wilson. With 37 second remaining in the first half, David Ojabo sacked Penn State quarterback Sean Clifford and forced a fumble at the Michigan 25-yard line. Clifford recovered his own fumble, and Stout kicked another 52-yard field goal, which made the score 7–6 in favor of Michigan at half-time.

On the opening drive of the second half, Michigan drove 75 yards on nine plays, ending with a one-yard touchdown pass from McNamara to Wilson. In the fourth quarter, Penn State drove 53 yards in 15 plays and scored  on a two-yard touchdown pass from Clifford to Tyler Warren. Clifford then threw to Jahan Dotson for a two-point conversion that tied the score at 14–14. On the ensuing possession, McNamara was sacked and fumbled, Derrick Tangelo recovering at Michigan's 16-yard line. The Michigan defense held, and Penn State was forced to settle for a 31-yard field goal by Stout, giving the Nittany Lions a three-point lead with 5:55 remaining in the game. Michigan then drove 75 yards, scoring with 3:29 remaining on a 47-yard touchdown pass from McNamara to Erick All. 

Michigan's defense registered 12 tackles for loss (TFL), including seven sacks (three by Aidan Hutchinson and two by David Ojabo).

at Maryland

Sources: 

    
    
    
    
    
    
    
    
    
    
    

On November 20, Michigan defeated Maryland, 59–18, at College Park, Maryland. On their first possession, Maryland drove to the Michigan 30-yard line, and Joseph Petrino  missed a 48-yard field goal attempt. Michigan then drove 70 yards, scoring on a two-yard touchdown pass from Cade McNamara to Luke Schoonmaker. Later in the first quarter, A. J. Henning returned a punt 14 yards to the Maryland 45-yard line. Michigan drove from there and scored on a one-yard run by Hassan Haskins to take a 14–0 lead.

Maryland responded with a 17-play, 68-yard drive that consumed six-and-a-half minutes. The Terrapins were stopped at the 13-yard line and settled for a 31-yard field goal by Petrino. With 4:00 remaining in the half, J. J. McCarthy led the Wolverines on a four-play 42-yard touchdown drive with a 14-yard run, a 13-yard pass to Cornelius Johnson, and a 13-yard touchdown pass to Mike Sainristil. In the final minute-and-a-half, Michigan drove 42 yards to the Maryland six-yard line, but were backed up by a personal foul penalty, and Jake Moody kicked a 39-yard field with four seconds remaining, which made the score 24–3 in favor of Michigan at half-time.

The teams combined for six touchdowns (four by Michigan, two by Maryland) in the third quarter.  Michigan struck first with a 56-yard drive, capped by a one-yard touchdown run by Haskins. Maryland responded with their own 74-yard drive capped by a seven-yard touchdown pass from Tagovailoa to Carlos Carrier. A. J. Henning returned the ensuing kickoff 81 yards for a touchdown. Maryland then drove 75 yards with Tagovailoa scoring on a 17-yard run; Tagovailoa also ran for a two-point conversion. Donovan Edwards then ran 77 yards for a touchdown. With 34 seconds left in the quarter, DJ Turner intercepted a Tagovailoa pass and returned it 42 yards for a touchdown.

Michigan scored once more in the fourth quarter after stopping Maryland on a fourth-and-one pass from the Maryland 34-yard line. From there, McCarthy passed to Edwards  at the five-yard line, and McCarthy scored on a five-yard run.

Michigan tallied over 500 yards of total offense in the game (352 passing and 151 rushing). Haskins gained 78 yards and passed the 1,000-yard mark, the 22nd player in program history to eclipse 1,000 rushing yards in a single season. With touchdowns on offense, defense and in the return game, Michigan scored in all three phases for the first time since October 10, 2015, against Northwestern. The touchdowns were Michigan's first of the season on special teams and defense. The Wolverines had two sacks in the game, one by Vincent Gray and the other by TJ Guy.

No. 2 Ohio State

Sources: 

    
    
    
    
    
    
    
    
    
    

On November 27, Michigan hosted their arch-rivals, the Ohio State Buckeyes, in the 117th playing of "The Game". The two teams last played each other in 2019 when Michigan lost to Ohio State 56–27. The two teams were scheduled to play each at the end of the 2020 season; however, the game was cancelled due to COVID-19 complications at Michigan, marking the first time that "The Game" was not played since 1917.

Michigan defeated Ohio State 42–27. Michigan opened the scoring in the first quarter via a 14-yard touchdown run from A. J. Henning. Ohio State responded with a 31-yard field goal by Noah Ruggles. In the second quarter, Ohio State took their only lead of the game via a 25-yard touchdown pass from C. J. Stroud to Garrett Wilson. Michigan responded with a one-yard touchdown run from Hassan Haskins. Ohio State scored the final points of the quarter via a 30-yard field goal by Ruggles, which made the score 14–13 in favor of Michigan at half-time. Michigan scored 14 points in the third quarter via two touchdown runs from Haskins, from 13 yards, and one yard, respectively. Ohio State scored 14 points in the fourth quarter via a one-yard touchdown run from TreVeyon Henderson and a 10-yard touchdown pass from Stroud to Henderson. Michigan scored 14 points in the quarter via two touchdown runs from Haskins, from two yards, and four yards, respectively.

Michigan earned their first victory over Ohio State since 2011, exactly ten years and one day since their last victory, and marked their first win over the Buckeyes in the Jim Harbaugh era. Hassan Haskins rushed for 169 yards, his sixth game of the year with over 100 yards rushing. Haskins' five rushing touchdowns against the Buckeyes was the most by any running back in the rivalry's history. The performance took him to a team-leading 18 touchdowns on the season and tied him for second in program history for single-season rushing touchdowns with Anthony Thomas and Chris Perry. Haskins' five rushing touchdowns also tied the Michigan single-game record set by Ron Johnson against Wisconsin in 1968. Michigan's defense held Ohio State to just 64 yards rushing, marking Ohio State's lowest rushing total on the season and just the second time all season under 100 rushing yards. With three sacks in the game Aidan Hutchinson set the Michigan single-season record with 13.0.

vs. No. 13 Iowa (Big Ten Championship Game)

Sources: 

    
    
    
    
    
    

With their victory over Ohio State, the Wolverines advanced to the Big Ten Championship Game for the first time in program history. They faced Iowa, each team having last won a Big Ten championship in 2004 when they shared the title. 

The championship game was played on December 4 at Lucas Oil Stadium in Indianapolis. Michigan, ranked No. 2, defeated No. 13 Iowa, 42–3. On their first drive of the game, Iowa drove 59 yards on 10 plays to the Michigan 12-yard line, but Caleb Shudak missed a 33-yard field goal attempt. Blake Corum then ran 67 yards for a touchdown with 6:38 remaining in the first quarter. After holding Iowa to a three-and-out, Michigan scored again as Cade McNamara threw a backwards pass to Donovan Edwards who threw to Roman Wilson for a 75-yard touchdown strike down the right sideline. On the next possession, Iowa drove 71 yards to Michigan's seven-yard line and settled for a 22-yard field goal by Caleb Shudak. At the end of the first quarter, A. J. Henning ran 29 yards to the Iowa 46, but McNamara then threw an interception picked by Jack Campbell who returned the ball to the Iowa 33-yard line. Neither team was able to mount a scoring drive in the second quarter, and Michigan led, 14–3, at halftime.

In the third quarter, Michigan drove 82 yard in 10 plays, culminating in a four-yard touchdown run by Hassan Haskins. Early in the fourth quarter, Cornelius Johnson blocked an Iowa punt, and Michigan took over at Iowa's 36-yard line. J. J. McCarthy then led a 36-yard touchdown drive culminating in a one-yard run by Haskins. On their next possession, the Wolverines drove 81 yards on eight plays capped by a five-yard touchdown pass from McNamara to Erick All with 5:24 remaining in the game. With 4:21 remaining, Caden Kolesar intercepted an Alex Padilla pass and returned it to the Iowa 36. A pass interference penalty moved the ball to the three-yard line, and Edwards scored on a one-yard run with 1:25 remaining.

With the win Michigan achieved their first 12-win season since 1997, and won their first conference title since 2004. With Edwards' passing touchdown in the first quarter, he became the first player to score touchdowns rushing, receiving, and passing in a single season since Vincent Smith in 2011. With two rushing touchdowns in the game, Haskins set the modern, single-season program record with 20 rushing touchdowns, surpassing the previous record of 19 set by Ron Johnson in 1968. With a sack in the game, Aidan Hutchinson increased his single-season program record with 14.0 sacks on the season, and was selected as the most valuable player of the championship game.

vs. No. 3 Georgia (Orange Bowl – CFP Semifinal)

Sources: 

    
    
    
    
    
    
    

In the final College Football Playoff rankings of the year announced on December 5, Michigan (12–1) was ranked second, earning their first playoff bid and a spot in the semifinal game to be played at the 2021 Orange Bowl against Georgia (12–1).

Michigan lost to Georgia 34–11. Georgia scored 14 points in the first quarter via a nine-yard touchdown pass from Stetson Bennett to Brock Bowers and an 18-yard touchdown pass from Kenny McIntosh to Adonai Mitchell. The teams exchanged field goals in the second quarter, first a 43-yard field goal by Jack Podlesny for Georgia, then a 36-yard field goal by Jake Moody for Michigan. Georgia added 10 points via a 28-yard field goal by Podlesny and a 57-yard touchdown pass from Bennett to Jermaine Burton, which made the score 27–3 in favor of Georgia at half-time. On the opening possession of the second half, Michigan moved the ball to the Georgia 14-yard line, however, they were unable to score following an interception in the end zone. Michigan's defense pressured Georgia into its first three-and-out of the game, however, their ensuing drive ended with a fumble, their third consecutive possession with a turnover. After a scoreless third quarter, Georgia extended their lead in the fourth quarter via a 39-yard touchdown pass from Bennett to James Cook. With 4:25 remaining in the game, Michigan scored their first touchdown of the game via a 35-yard touchdown pass from J. J. McCarthy to Andrel Anthony and a two-point conversion run from A. J. Henning.

Hassan Haskins became the first Wolverine to eclipse 1,300 yards rushing in a season since Denard Robinson in 2010 (1,702 yards). Aidan Hutchinson finished the season with the program's single-season sack record (14.0) and David Ojabo finished the season with the program's single-season forced-fumble record (five).

Roster

Awards and honors

Statistics

Offensive statistics

Defensive statistics

Special teams statistics

2022 NFL Draft

References

External links

Michigan
Michigan Wolverines football seasons
Big Ten Conference football champion seasons
Michigan Wolverines football